Anca Pop (October 22, 1984 – December 16, 2018) was a Romanian Canadian singer-songwriter. On July 12, 2017 she released her self-titled debut studio album exclusively in Japan which spawned four singles including: "Free Love", "Super Cool", "Ring Around", and "Loco Poco".

In 2008, she met Yugoslav and Bosnian musician Goran Bregović, and she wrote two songs for his thirteenth studio album Champagne for Gypsies. After her collaboration with Bregović, she signed a record deal with Roton Music. She also appeared on the cover of Playboy for the July–August issue.

Early life 
Anca Pop was born on October 22, 1984 in Moldova Nouă, Romania. When she was 3 years old, her parents fled the Socialist Republic of Romania to Yugoslavia. Once they arrived they were taken to a refugee camp near Belgrade; they stayed there 7 months before going to a political asylum in Kitchener, Ontario, Canada. She started being passionated by music, and she started taking mandolin and singing lessons when she was 7 years old. Eventually her parents came back in Romania as soon as the communism ended.

Career 
Her debut single, "Free Love", was released on April 28, 2015 with an accompanying music video on the same day. A month later, another version of the video was released for Playboy magazine. "Free Love" was also voted by 100,000 people as the best pop song of July during a poll for OurStage. "Super Cool" was released on March 24, 2016 as the second single from her upcoming debut studio album. In May of the same year she was invited along with Emil Rengle to the Cannes Film Festival by Warner Music Group for a possible collaboration with them. The third single, "Ring Around", was released on January 25, 2017 with an accompanying music video on the same day. The fourth single, "Loco Poco", was released in 38 countries on May 26, 2017 by Roton and Edel Italy.

Personal life
She lived in an apartment in Bucharest. She was passionated by spirituality and she searched for inspiration in Peru, India and Thailand. She came out as bisexual on a TV show named Totul pentru dragoste, and she had an open relationship with a girl named Fraga.

Death
The singer died on December 16, 2018, after she lost control of her car for unknown reasons and the car plunged into the Danube river, near the commune Svinița, while she was heading to her parents' home. Three divers, helped by military of the emergency authorities, were involved in the recovery of the body. The funeral took place on December 20, 2018, on the Danube's shore, in the commune of Sviniţa, being the artist's wish to be buried as close to the place of death.

Discography

Studio albums

Singles

As lead artist

As featured artist

References 

1984 births
2018 deaths
Romanian singer-songwriters
Canadian women singer-songwriters
People from Moldova Nouă
Romanian refugees
Romanian emigrants to Canada
Road incident deaths in Romania
Deaths by drowning
LGBT record producers
Romanian bisexual people
Romanian LGBT singers
Romanian LGBT songwriters
Canadian bisexual writers
Canadian LGBT singers
Canadian LGBT songwriters
Bisexual singers
Bisexual songwriters
Bisexual women
21st-century Romanian LGBT people
21st-century Canadian LGBT people